Gelechia obscurella is a moth in the family Gelechiidae. It is found in North America, where it has been recorded from Kentucky.

The forewings are ochreous, densely flecked with dark brown.

References

Gelechia
Moths described in 1872